Innocent Tichaona Gangaidzo, is a Zimbabwean gastroenterologist, who currently serves as the president of the East, Central, and Southern Africa College of Physicians (ECSACOP). Gangaidzo is the current editor-in-chief of the Central African Journal of Medicine.

Career 
In 1984, Gangaidzo graduated in medicine from the University of Oxford. In 1985, he was practising in Oxford. 

He earned master's degrees in clinical epidemiology and biostatistics from the University of Newcastle in Australia, and in physiological sciences from the University of Oxford. In addition, he has a Diploma in Tropical Medicine and Hygiene from the University of London. In Birmingham and London, he received specialized training in internal medicine and gastroenterology.

His areas of interest include colorectal cancer and African iron excess as well as gastroenterological and hepatological diseases, in particular. Gangaidzo has received grants from a number of international organizations, such as the National Institutes of Health. ECSACOP's first vice president and the current college president is Professor Gangaidzo.

He was president of the Medical and Dental Practitioners Council of Zimbabwe from 2010 to 2015. He is described as a leading practitioner.

Selected publications

References 

Living people
Year of birth missing (living people)
Alumni of the University of Oxford
Alumni of the University of London
University of Newcastle (Australia) alumni
Academic staff of the University of Zimbabwe
21st-century physicians
20th-century births
Fellows of the Royal College of Physicians